Landry Ndikumana (born 5 October 1992) is a Burundian football striker who plays for Bangladesh Premier League club Muktijoddha Sangsad KC. He was a squad member for the 2019 CECAFA Cup.

References

1992 births
Living people
Burundian footballers
Burundi international footballers
Vital'O F.C. players
Mbarara City FC players
AS Inter Star players
Muktijoddha Sangsad KC  players
Association football forwards
Burundian expatriate footballers
Expatriate footballers in Uganda
Burundian expatriate sportspeople in Uganda
Expatriate footballers in Tanzania
Burundian expatriate sportspeople in Tanzania
Expatriate footballers in Rwanda
Burundian expatriate sportspeople in Rwanda